Labedaea rhizosphaerae is a bacterium from the family Pseudonocardiaceae which has been isolated from rhizosphere soil from the plant Peucedanum japonicum on Mara Island, Korea.

References

Pseudonocardiales
Bacteria described in 2012